= Yucatán, Mexico =

Yucatán, Mexico, may refer to:

- Yucatán (state), one of the 32 component federal entities of the United Mexican States
- Mexico's portion of the Yucatán Peninsula, comprising the states of Yucatán, Campeche, and Quintana Roo
